Bunyodkor Football Club is an Uzbek professional football club based in Tashkent, Uzbekistan. The club was formed 2005 in Tashkent, and played its first matches in Tashkent regional liga in Uzbekistan Second League with name Neftgazmontaj-Quruvchi. The club was renamed PFC Quruvchi in 2006. The club played its matches at MHSK Stadium. Since playing their first matches, more than 50 players have made a competitive first-team appearance for the club.

Anvar Gafurov presently holds the team record for number of matches played for the club. He made 228 appearances ahead of Hayrulla Karimov with 222 caps (as of 22 November 2015).

Anvarjon Soliev  is club's all-time top scorer with 65 goals, of which 46 were scored in league competition, making him the Bunyodkor player who has scored the most goals in the Uzbek League. The 2nd top scorer is Rivaldo with 43 goals, Server Djeparov and Victor Karpenko are third with 38 goals.

Bunyodkor has employed several famous players such 1999 FIFA World Player and Ballon d'Or winner Rivaldo.

List of Players

Statistics correct as of 22 November 2015

References

External links
 FC Bunyodkor Official Website 

Sport in Tashkent
FC Bunyodkor